Mazhom railway station, also known as Mazhama railway station, lies on Northern Railway Network Zone of Indian Railways. It is the major railway stations in Budgam district. The station connects Magam town (3 km away from station) with rest of the parts of state.

Design
The station features Kashmiri wood architecture, with an intended ambience of a royal court which is designed to complement the local surroundings to the station. Station signage is predominantly in Urdu, English and Hindi.

History

Controversy
The railway station was named by Northern Railways as Rajwansheer railway station which led to the large scale controversy by the local population. The controversy was resolved in December 2009 by the intervention of Omar Abdullah and the station was renamed as Mazhom railway station.

See also
 Budgam railway station

References

Railway stations in Budgam district